George Upfold (May 7, 1796 – August 26, 1872) was the first Episcopal Bishop of Indiana after the diocese's division from the Missionary Diocese of the Northwest. He is officially styled, though, as II bishop of Indiana since missionary bishop Jackson Kemper is styled I bishop of Indiana.

Early life
Upfold was born in Shenely Green, Surrey, England, and emigrated to the United States with his parents at the age of six.  The family settled in Albany, New York.  He earned his bachelor's degree from Union College in 1814.  Initially intending to enter the medical profession, he earned a medical doctorate from the College of Physicians and Surgeons in New York City in 1816.  Two years later, Upfold abandoned his medical career took up theology.  He was assigned to be deacon at Trinity Church in Lansingburg, New York in October 1818.  While there, he was ordained a priest on July 13, 1820.  He was appointed rector of Church of St. Luke in the Fields, New York, about 1823. Upfold was then elected rector of St. Thomas's Church, New York, until 1831 when he moved to Pennsylvania to become the rector of Trinity Church in Pittsburgh.  He remained at Trinity until 1849.

Bishop of Indiana
In December 1849, Upfold was elected Bishop of Indiana.  He was the 50th bishop in the ECUSA, and was consecrated on December 16, 1849 by Bishops Benjamin Bosworth Smith, Charles Pettit McIlvaine, and Jackson Kemper.  While bishop, Upfold also served as rector for St. John's Church in Lafayette, Indiana and Christ Church Cathedral in Indianapolis.  By 1855, the Diocese of Indiana had built is status and stability to the point that it could financially support the office of bishop, allowing Upfold to concentrate only on his duties as bishop. Upfold received a LL.D. degree from the Western University of Pennsylvania in 1856.  In 1857 he moved the seat of the Diocese to Indianapolis where he remained in office until 1872.  He served as the sole bishop until 1865 when, crippled by gout, he arranged for the election of a coadjutor bishop.

He died in 1872 and is buried at Crown Hill Cemetery, Indianapolis.

Family
Upfold married Sarah Sophia Graves in 1817.  They had two daughters, Sophia Bicker Upfold, who later married Joseph J. Bingham, editor of the Indiana Daily Sentinel; and Emily L. Upfold, who became the librarian of the Diocese of Indiana.

Notes

External links
Bibliographic directory from Project Canterbury
George Upfold papers, Rare Books and Manuscripts, Indiana State Library

References

1796 births
1872 deaths
Burials at Crown Hill Cemetery
Episcopal bishops of Indiana
19th-century Anglican bishops in the United States
People from Surrey
Union College (New York) alumni
Columbia University Vagelos College of Physicians and Surgeons alumni
People from Lansingburgh, New York